Boris Theodore Pash (born Boris Fedorovich Pashkovsky, Russian: Борис Фёдорович Пашковский; 20 June 1900 – 11 May 1995) was a United States Army military intelligence officer. He commanded the Alsos Mission during World War II and retired with the rank of colonel.

Early life
Boris Fedorovich Pashkovsky was born in San Francisco, California, on 20 June 1900. His father was Reverend Theodore Pashkovsky (would become Most Reverend Metropolitan Theophilus from 1934 to 1950), a Russian Orthodox priest who had been sent to California by the Church in 1894. His father was recalled to Russia in 1906, and the entire family returned to Russia in 1912. His mother was Serbian American—Ella Dabovich—sister of Sebastian Dabovich.

In 1916-1917, both father and son joined the ranks of the Russian army as it fought against Germany and the Austro-Hungarian Empire in World War I: Theodore – as a military chaplain, and 16-year-old Boris – as an artillery private. During the Russian Revolution, he served in the White navy in the Black Sea from 1918 to 1920 against the Bolsheviks. Because he could speak English, he served as a translator in meetings with the British. For his services he was awarded the Cross of St. George.

On 1 July 1920, he married Lydia Vladimirovna Ivanova, and chose to return to the United States when the Bolshevik consolidation of power became apparent. He was able to secure employment with the YMCA in Berlin, where his son Edgar Constantine Boris Pashkovsky was born on 14 June 1921.

Upon returning to the United States with his family in 1923, he attended Springfield College, in Springfield, Massachusetts, where he graduated with a Bachelor of Physical Education. It was during this time that he changed the family name from Pashkovsky to Pash.

Pash taught at Hollywood High School in Los Angeles from 1924 until 1940. During this time he continued his education, receiving a Master of Science in Education from the University of Southern California in 1939. He also joined the United States Army Reserve, and was assigned to the Infantry Intelligence Branch. As part of his training, he qualified for certification by the Federal Bureau of Investigation.

World War II

Pash was called to active duty with the Army in 1940, and became chief of counter-intelligence at the IX Corps Area headquarters at the Presidio of San Francisco. In that role he became involved with the 1942 Baja Peninsula mission that investigated the possibility of the Japanese establishing a base in Mexico during World War II.

Pash was also called upon to investigate suspected Soviet espionage at the Radiation Laboratory at the University of California. He interrogated staff, including Robert Oppenheimer, whom he concluded "may still be connected with the Communist Party". Pash did not believe that Oppenheimer was a spy. He felt that Oppenheimer's personal honor and concern for his reputation would deter him from such action. Pash therefore did not recommend Oppenheimer's removal from the Manhattan Project, merely that Oppenheimer be accompanied by counter-intelligence agents.

He was also the military leader of the Alsos Mission, an Allied operation established in late 1943 to determine how far the Axis had progressed toward developing nuclear weapons by seizing facilities, materiel, and scientists related to the German nuclear energy project.

Post war
After the war, Pash served in various military intelligence positions. He served under General Douglas MacArthur in Japan in 1946 and 1947. Thanks to his efforts, the Soviet attempt to gain a foothold in Japan through a local Orthodox Church failed. Instead, Pash organized for the Bishop Benjamin (Basalyga) to arrive in early January 1947 to take the reins, and thus the American Metropoly, rather than the then Soviet-controlled Moscow Patriarchate, secured influence in the region. As a result of this combination, Pash had a public clash with the Soviet General Kuzma Derevyanko. On January 9, two days after the first sermon of the new bishop, a reception was held at the Dutch embassy at which Pash met his longtime acquaintance, Lieutenant General Derevyanko, who represented the USSR in the Allied Council for Japan. The rival picks of the Russian emigrant and the Soviet commander were well known; in addition, they sometimes played against one another in chess. Shaking the Russian-American's hand that winter day, Derevyanko publicly declared: "My good friend, Colonel Pash, once again checkmated me. Of course, as you can imagine, I'm talking about chess." Boris retorted: "I assure you, gentlemen, that in all other cases it was out of business."

From 1948 to 1951, he served as a military representative to the Central Intelligence Agency. During this time, he was in charge of a controversial CIA program called PB-7, which had been formed to handle "wet affairs" like kidnappings and assassinations. There is no evidence that he ever carried out any, and denied that he had in testimony before the Church Committee in 1975. He served as Special Forces planning officer with the U.S. forces in Austria from 1952 to 1953. His final postings were back in the United States, as Deputy Assistant Chief of Staff for Intelligence of the Sixth Army from 1953 to 1956), and in the office of the Assistant Secretary of Defense for Guided Missiles in Washington, D.C., from 1956 until his retirement from the Army in 1957. In 1954, he testified in the Oppenheimer security hearing, recounting the misgivings that he had about Oppenheimer in 1943.

On leaving the Army, Pash became chief of the Eastern European and USSR Division of the Quartermaster Technological Intelligence Agency. In 1961 he transferred to the United States Army Foreign Science and Technology Center. He retired
from the civil service in June 1963.

In retirement, Pash published The Alsos Mission, a book recounting his wartime experiences in Europe, in 1980. He was inducted into the Military Intelligence Hall of Fame in 1988. His decorations included the Army Distinguished Service Medal, the Legion of Merit, the Order of the British Empire and the Order of St. George.

He visited Russia after the August Putsch for the first time since he left the country with the remains of Wrangel's Fleet in 1920, being one of the few White Russian veterans to live to see the end of Communist Party rule in Russia. Pash died on 11 May 1995 in Greenbrae, California at the age of 94, and was buried in the Serbian Cemetery in Colma, California. He was survived by his wife Gladys and son Edgar. His papers are in the Hoover Institute at Stanford University.

Notes

References

Further reading

 http://asachitose.com/page7.htm

External links

1900 births
1995 deaths
Manhattan Project people
United States Army personnel of World War II
People of the Central Intelligence Agency
United States Army colonels
Russian military personnel of World War I
White movement people
White Russian emigrants to the United States
University of Southern California alumni
People from San Francisco
American people of Russian descent
American people of Serbian descent
American people of Ukrainian descent
Recipients of the Legion of Merit
Anti-communists from the Russian Empire
American anti-communists
Eastern Orthodox Christians from the United States
Operation Alsos
Springfield College (Massachusetts) alumni